Events from the year 2001 in Ireland.

Incumbents
 President: Mary McAleese
 Taoiseach: Bertie Ahern (FF)
 Tánaiste: Mary Harney (PD)
 Minister for Finance: Charlie McCreevy (FF)
 Chief Justice: Ronan Keane
 Dáil: 28th
 Seanad: 21st

Events
 22 March – Ireland confirms its first case of foot-and-mouth disease.
 7 June – Voters reject the Treaty of Nice in a referendum.
 9 September – The National Museum of Ireland's Museum of Country Life at Turlough, County Mayo, is officially opened.
 14 September – Ireland holds a national day of mourning following the 9/11 terrorist attacks in New York City and Washington, D.C. All sports, public functions, and entertainment are cancelled on orders of the government. Schools, businesses, and shops are closed, also on orders of the government. President Mary McAleese says that the events are "an attack on the very foundations of human dignity" and left the people of Ireland "sad, shocked, sickened, grieving, disbelieving, outraged, frightened all at once."
 14 October – The first multiple state funeral is held in honour of ten Irish Republican Army volunteers who were executed by the British for their part in the War of Independence.
 23 October – The Provisional Irish Republican Army commences disarmament after peace talks.
 4 November – The Police Service of Northern Ireland is established.
 17 November – The Gaelic Athletic Association votes to abolish its controversial Rule 21 which previously prevented members of the British Army and the Police Service of Northern Ireland from playing.
 14 December – Irish euro coins becomes available in An Post and bank branches. These "starter packs" contained nineteen coins worth €6.35 and could be purchased for IR£5.

Arts and literature
 February–April – Conor McPherson's play Port Authority premièred in London and Dublin.
 26 June – Two Old Master paintings from the Alfred Beit collection were stolen from Russborough House.
 8 August – Australian soap opera series Neighbours gets its first ever Irish transmission on Network 2.
 1 October – First season of Bachelors Walk on Network 2.
 Publication of Julian Gough's novel Juno & Juliet.
 Publication of John McGahern's last novel That They May Face the Rising Sun.
 Publication of Kate Thompson's children's novel The Beguilers.

Sport

Equestrianism 
Show jumping
Kevin Babington, Peter Charles, Jessica Kurten and Dermott Lennon won the senior European Show Jumping Championships Team Gold medals.

Golf
Murphy's Irish Open was won by Colin Montgomerie (Scotland).

Births
 18 January – Niamh McCormack, actress
 27 March – Gaby Lewis, cricketer
 8 August – Tyler Toland, footballer
 19 October – Art Parkinson, actor

Deaths

January to June
 5 January – G. E. M. Anscombe, analytic philosopher (b. 1919)
 21 February – Desmond Leslie, pilot, filmmaker and writer (b. 1921)
 8 March – Ninette de Valois, founder of the Royal Ballet (b. 1898)
 18 May – Seán Mac Stíofáin, English-born, Irish republican paramilitary leader (b. 1928) 
 1 June – Peter Corr, international soccer player and father of The Corrs members (b. 1923)
 27 June – Michael Moynihan, Labour Party Senator and TD (b. 1917)

July to December
 4 July – Anne Yeats, painter and stage designer (born 1919).
 1 August – Joe Lynch, actor (born 1925).
 27 August – John Joe 'Purty' Landers, Kerry Gaelic footballer (born 1907).
 31 August – Donal O'Sullivan, Cork Gaelic footballer (born 1930).
 23 September – Kevin Boland, Fianna Fáil TD, served as Minister for Defence, Minister for Social Welfare and Minister for Local Government (born 1917).
 24 October – Eamon Kelly, actor (born 1914).
 27 October – Seán Condon, Cork hurler (born 1923).
 4 November – Denis Gallagher, Fianna Fáil TD and Cabinet Minister (born 1922).
 10 December – Freddie Anderson, playwright and socialist (born 1922).
 12 December – Michael Torrens-Spence, held commissions in the Royal Navy Fleet Air Arm, the Royal Air Force, the British Army, Ulster Special Constabulary and Ulster Defence Regiment (born 1914).
 14 December – Eoin Ryan, Fianna Fáil Seanad Éireann member (born 1920).
 23 December – Mark Clinton, Fine Gael TD, former Minister for Agriculture and MEP (born 1915).

See also
2001 in Irish television

References